Hosts of Rebecca is a novel by Alexander Cordell, first published in 1960.  It is the second in Cordell's "Mortymer Trilogy", followed by Song of the Earth.

Cordell's style and subject matter are reminiscent of Richard Llewellyn's How Green Was My Valley.

Plot summary

The plot concerns the Rebecca Riots in the 19th century.  The action is seen through the eyes of young Jethro Mortymer. It is based on the true events of the Rebecca Riots in which the people of West Wales protested against the toll gate charges of the business men and land owners of the time. The Rebecca name refers to the leader of the campaign, which was a man dressing in women's attire to protect his identity.

1960 British novels
Anglo-Welsh novels
Novels by Alexander Cordell
Novels set in Wales
Novels set in the 1830s
Novels set in the 1840s
Victor Gollancz Ltd books